The 2017 season was FC Sheriff Tiraspol's 21st season, and their 20th in the Divizia Naţională, the top-flight of Moldovan football.

Squad

Out on loan

Transfers

In

Out

Loans in

Loans out

Released

Competitions

Divizia Națională

Results summary

Results

League table

Moldovan Cup

Quarterfinal to be played during the 2018 season

UEFA Champions League

Qualifying rounds

UEFA Europa League

Qualifying rounds

Group stage

Squad Statistics

Appearances and goals

|-
|colspan="14"|Players away on loan :

|-
|colspan="14"|Players who left Sheriff Tiraspol during the season:

|}

Goal scorers

Disciplinary Record

Notes

References

External links 
 

FC Sheriff Tiraspol seasons
Moldovan football clubs 2017–18 season